The Pride is the fifth studio album from the band InMe. It is the first full-length album of new material to feature lead guitarist Gazz Marlow.  It was released via PledgeMusic on 19 February 2012. The album was awarded KKKK by Kerrang! and 8/10 by Rock Sound magazine, and described on Twitter as "magnificent" by XFMs Rich Walters.

Development of the album
The development of the album started as early as 2009. Dave McPherson wrote a whole album's worth of material more in the vein of Herald Moth's technical metal style but scrapped all but two songs, which feature on the band's best of compilation.

The second wave of writing started in 2010 and continues through until mid-2011, with the track list gradually being built up. Songs such as "A Great Man" were finished earlier, whereas other tunes such as "Moonlit Seabed" were completed just prior to the final recording session in October 2011.

Style
Having drawn a line under the technical metal trappings of 2009's Herald Moth, The Pride is said to take on a much more song based approach. Whilst there are still technical aspects, there is a greater focus on the songs rather than the progressive aspects of the band's music. The album is said to resemble both White Butterfly and Daydream Anonymous in terms of style and sound. Lyrically and Vocally, the album is more positive than Daydream Anonymous and Herald Moth, with soaring melodies conveying poetic lyrics.

Track listing
All songs/lyrics written by Dave McPherson. All music by InMe.

 Reverie Shores
 Moonlit Seabed
 A Great Man
 Silver Womb
 Pantheon
 Escape to Mysteriopa
 Guardian
 Beautiful Sky Gardens
 Halcyon Genesis
 Legacy
 You Had My Heart [iTunes Bonus Track Version]

Personnel

Band
 Dave McPherson – vocals, guitar
 Gazz Marlow – lead guitar
 Greg McPherson – bass guitar
 Simon Taylor – drums, percussion

References

InMe albums
2012 albums